The Casper Downtown Historic District in Casper, Wyoming, US is a historic district which was listed on the National Register of Historic Places in 2016.  The district is generally bounded by David St., East B C St., Beech St., and Midwest Ave.

It includes the Turner-Cottman Building at 124 West Second Street.

References

Historic districts on the National Register of Historic Places in Wyoming
Natrona County, Wyoming